Andrew Paul Payton (born 23 October 1967) is an English former professional footballer. A striker, Payton played for seven professional clubs in England and Scotland, scoring 200 goals in over 500 appearances, and gaining the nickname the Padiham Predator.

Playing career
After being released by hometown club Burnley at the age of 15, Payton began his career as an apprentice at Hull City, signing a professional contract in 1985. He joined Middlesbrough for £700,000 in November 1991, which remained Hull's record sale for 15 years, before signing for Celtic in August 1992. After just over a year at Celtic, he returned to England to play for Barnsley. In 1996 Huddersfield Town signed him for £325,000, before selling him to Burnley as part of a swap deal with Paul Barnes in 1998. After five years at Burnley, including a loan spell at Blackpool where he scored once against Bury, he ended his career in non-league football with Stalybridge Celtic and then Colne.

Coaching career
After retiring from playing, Payton gained a UEFA A Coaching License and coached at Colne, Padiham and Northwich Victoria. He was appointed manager of Garstang in May 2019, but left the club in August.

Career statistics

References

External links
Andy Payton article Amber Nectar

1967 births
Living people
English footballers
English Football League players
Scottish Football League players
Association football forwards
Hull City A.F.C. players
Middlesbrough F.C. players
Celtic F.C. players
Barnsley F.C. players
Huddersfield Town A.F.C. players
Burnley F.C. players
Blackpool F.C. players
Stalybridge Celtic F.C. players
Colne F.C. players
Garstang F.C. managers
English football managers